Juan José Perea Mendoza (born 23 February 2000) is a Colombian professional footballer who plays as a forward for Bundesliga club VfB Stuttgart.

Career

Porto and Panathinaikos
Perea played for Porto, helping the club to win the 2018–19 UEFA Youth League. He made three appearances in the competition for the Portuguese club.

Perea joined Panathinaikos in the summer of 2019, signing a two years' contract for an undisclosed fee. He made his first appearance for Panathinaikos in the Greek Superleague against the team's 3–1 loss to OFI on 31 August 2019. On 10 November 2019, he scored his first goal in the 3–2 win for Panathinaikos in the Athenian Derby against AEK Athens.

On 1 September 2020, he joined the Greek club Volos.

PAS Giannina
On 19 July 2021, Perea signed a three-year contract with PAS Giannina.

In early January 2022, he was linked with domestic and foreign clubs, including AEK Athens. PAS Giannina reportedly demanded a €1 million transfer fee with Perea's former club Panathinaikos retaining the right to claim the player by matching any offer.

VfB Stuttgart 
On 8 July 2022, VfB Stuttgart announced the signing of Perea on a four-year deal. The transfer fee was reported as over €2.2 million, becoming the most expensive player sold by PAS Giannina.

Career statistics

Honours
Porto youth  
 UEFA Youth League: 2018–19
Individual
PAS Giannina Player of the Year: 2021–22

References

External links

Profile at Panathinaikos website

2000 births
Living people
Colombian footballers
Footballers from Bogotá
Association football forwards
Super League Greece players
FC Porto players
Panathinaikos F.C. players
Volos N.F.C. players
PAS Giannina F.C. players
VfB Stuttgart players
Colombian expatriate footballers
Colombian expatriate sportspeople in Portugal
Expatriate footballers in Portugal
Colombian expatriate sportspeople in Greece
Expatriate footballers in Greece
Colombian expatriate sportspeople in Germany
Expatriate footballers in Germany